Por Si No Te Vuelvo a Ver (In Case I Never See You Again) is a 1997 Mexican drama film, directed by Juan Pablo Villaseñor and produced by the Centro de Capacitación Cinematográfica. The film received eight Ariel Awards in 1998 including Best Picture, Best Director, Best Actor and Best Actress.

Plot
A musical quintet formed by retired elders in an asylum, under the pretext of delivering the ashes of his friend Rosita (Blanca Torres) to Margarita (Leticia Huijara), her niece, in order to achieve their dream of performing on stage.

Main cast
Jorge Galván as Bruno
Ignacio Retes as Poncho
Justo Martínez as Óscar Martínez
Max Kerlow as Gonzalo
Rodolfo Vélez as Fabián
Leticia Huijara as Margarita
Zaide Silvia Gutiérrez as Nurse Silvia
Ana Bertha Espín as the asylum director
Angelina Peláez as Diana Menchaca
Blanca Torres as Rosita
José Carlos Rodríguez as Dr. Eduardo Bolaños
Alfredo Alonso as Vinicio
Óscar Castañeda as Miranda
Aurora Cortés as Ofelia

Awards

Ariel Awards
The Ariel Awards are awarded annually by the Mexican Academy of Film Arts and Sciences in Mexico. Por Si No Te Vuelvo a Ver won eight awards out of 19 nominations.

|-
|rowspan="19" scope="row"| 1998
|scope="row"| Centro de Capacitación Cinematográfica
|rowspan="1" scope="row"| Best Picture
| 
|-
|scope="row"| Juan Pablo Villaseñor
|rowspan="1" scope="row"| Best Director
| 
|-
|scope="row"| Jorge Galván
|rowspan="1" scope="row"| Best Actor
| 
|-
|scope="row"| Leticia Huijara
|rowspan="1" scope="row"| Best Actress
| 
|-
|scope="row"| Max Kerlow
|rowspan="2" scope="row"| Best Supporting Actor
| 
|-
|scope="row"| Justo Martinez
| 
|-
|scope="row"| Angelina Peláez
|rowspan="2" scope="row"| Best Supporting Actress
| 
|-
|scope="row"| Zaide Silvia Gutiérrez
| 
|-
|scope="row"| Ignacio Retes
|rowspan="1" scope="row"| Best Actor in a Minor Role
| 
|-
|scope="row"| Blanca Torres
|rowspan="2" scope="row"| Best Actress in a Minor Role
| 
|-
|scope="row"| Ana Bertha Espín
| 
|-
|rowspan="3"| Juan Pablo Villaseñor
|rowspan="1" scope="row"| Best Screenplay
| 
|-
|rowspan="1" scope="row"| Best Original Story
| 
|-
|rowspan="1" scope="row"| Best First Feature Film
| 
|-
|scope="row"| Tito Enríquez
|rowspan="1" scope="row"| Best Original Score
| 
|-
|scope="row"| Rocío Ramírez
|rowspan="1" scope="row"| Best Art Direction
| 
|-
|scope="row"| Guillermo Rodríguez
|rowspan="1" scope="row"| Best Set Design
| 
|-
|scope="row"| Verónica Telch
|rowspan="1" scope="row"| Best Costume Design
| 
|-
|scope="row"| Diana Byrne
|rowspan="1" scope="row"| Best Makeup
| 
|-

External links

References

1997 films
1997 drama films
Mexican drama films
1990s Spanish-language films
1990s Mexican films